The archery tournaments at the 2017 World Games in Wrocław was played between 22 and 30 July. 96 archery competitors, from 34 nations, participated in the tournament. The archery competition took place at Pergola Centennial Hall in Lower Silesian Voivodeship.

Qualification

Timeline

Schedule
All time are Central European Summer Time (UTC+02:00)

Participating nations
Poland, as the host country, receives a guaranteed spot, in case it were not to earn one by the regular qualifying methods.

Medal table

Medalists

Men

Women

Mixed

See also
Archery at the 2016 Summer Olympics

External links
 World Archery
 Archery on IWGA website
 Schedule
 Entry list
 Results book

 
2017 World Games
World Games
2017
International archery competitions hosted by Poland